Agostino da Siena, O.F.M. (died 1484) was a Roman Catholic prelate who served as Bishop of Montemarano (1477–1484).

Biography
Agostino da Siena was ordained a priest in the Order of Friars Minor.
On 24 Jan 1477, he was appointed during the papacy of Pope Sixtus IV as Bishop of Montemarano.
He served as Bishop of Montemarano until his death in 1484.

References

External links and additional sources
 (for Chronology of Bishops) 
 (for Chronology of Bishops)  

15th-century Italian Roman Catholic bishops
Bishops appointed by Pope Sixtus IV
1484 deaths